PP-2 Attock-II is a Constituency of Provincial Assembly of Punjab.

Pakistan General election 2018 
In 2018 Pakistani general election, Jhangir Khanzada a ticket holder of PML(N) won PP-2 Attock II election by taking 45,965 votes.

See also
 PP-1 Attock-I
 PP-3 Attock-III

References

External links
 Election commission Pakistan's official website
 Awazoday.com check result
 Official Website of Government of Punjab

Provincial constituencies of Punjab, Pakistan